Statistics of Úrvalsdeild in the 1975 season.

Overview
It was contested by 8 teams, and ÍA won the championship. ÍA's Matthías Hallgrímsson was the top scorer with 10 goals.

League standings

Results
Each team played every opponent once home and away for a total of 14 matches.

References

Úrvalsdeild karla (football) seasons
Iceland
Iceland
1975 in Icelandic football